The 2005–06 Welsh League Cup season was won by Total Network Solutions, beating Port Talbot Town in the final. It was the second victory for Total Network Solutions in the competition, and the first appearance by Port Talbot Town in the final. The final took place at Park Avenue, in Aberystwyth, Wales. The match was refereed by Ray Ellingham.

Round and draw dates
Source

Knockout stage
Sources

Preliminary round

|}

First round

|}

Second round

|}

Semi-finals

 
|}

Final

See also
 Welsh League Cup
 Welsh Premier League
 Welsh Cup

References

External links
Official League Cup Website
 Welsh-Premier.com Loosemores League Cup
Loosemores Solicitors Official Website

Welsh League Cup seasons
Lea